Andrew "Jock" Wemyss (pronounced "Weemz") (22 May 1893, Galashiels – 21 January 1974, Edinburgh) was a Scottish rugby union player, who played at prop. Wemyss lost one of his eyes in World War I, but continued to play after the war (games were suspended during the conflict).

Rugby Union career

Amateur career

Wemyss played for Brunstane in Edinburgh.

From the Musselburgh News of 5 March 1920:

Mr Andrew Wemyss, who resides in Joppa, and is a former member of the Brunstane Rugby Football Club, has been selected by the Scottish Rugby Football Union to take pert in the international match against England. It is the third international honour which has fallen to the lot of this player.

He became a founder member of two rugby union clubs; first Haddington and then Co-Optimists.

Wemyss, together with George St Claire Murray, a rugby enthusiast from the Watsonians club, founded the Co-Optimists invitational rugby club in 1924. This came after an invitation game against Haddington, a club Wemyss had been a founder member of at the age of 17.

Wemyss went on to be successful journalist and commentator, and on the occasion of Haddington's 90th anniversary, the club received a letter from the Bill McLaren stating how much he owed Jock for early tutelage.

See also
 Alex Angus and Charlie Usher, who also played both before and after the First World War.
 Thomas Gisborne Gordon, one-armed Irish player.

References 

 Bath, Richard (ed.) The Scotland Rugby Miscellany (Vision Sports Publishing Ltd, 2007 )
profile at scrum.com

1893 births
1974 deaths
Edinburgh Wanderers RFC players
Haddington RFC players
Rugby union players from Galashiels
Scotland international rugby union players
Scottish disabled sportspeople
Scottish rugby union players
Rugby union props